Epiphragma is a genus of crane fly in the family Limoniidae.

Species
Subgenus Epiphragma Osten Sacken, 1860

E. adoxum Alexander, 1953
E. adspersum (Wiedemann, 1828)
E. amphileucum Alexander, 1941
E. ancistrum Mao & Yang, 2009
E. annulicorne Alexander, 1921
E. arizonense Alexander, 1946
E. atroterminatum Alexander, 1943
E. auricosta Alexander, 1939
E. bicinctiferum Alexander, 1935
E. binigrocinctum Alexander, 1962
E. breve Mao & Yang, 2009
E. buscki Alexander, 1913
E. caligatum Alexander, 1954
E. caribicum Alexander, 1970
E. celator Alexander, 1946
E. chionopezum Alexander, 1960
E. circinatum Osten Sacken, 1886
E. claudia Alexander, 1946
E. collessi Theischinger, 1996
E. commopterum Alexander, 1966
E. cordillerense Alexander, 1913
E. cubense Alexander, 1930
E. cynotis Alexander, 1946
E. delectabile Alexander, 1979
E. deliberatum Alexander, 1939
E. delicatulum Osten Sacken, 1888
E. diadema Alexander, 1939
E. distivena Alexander, 1932
E. divisum Alexander, 1923
E. dysaithrium Alexander, 1966
E. dysommatum Alexander, 1965
E. elongatum Mao & Yang, 2009
E. enixoides Alexander, 1962
E. enixum Alexander, 1939
E. evanescens Alexander, 1940
E. fabricii Alexander, 1913
E. farri Alexander, 1951
E. fasciapenne (Say, 1823)
E. felix Alexander, 1943
E. filiforme Alexander, 1940
E. fuscodiscale Alexander, 1936
E. fuscoterminale Alexander, 1948
E. gaigei Alexander, 1929
E. genuale Alexander, 1934
E. gloriolum Alexander, 1936
E. gracilicorne Alexander, 1916
E. gracilistylus Alexander, 1933
E. hardyi Alexander, 1922
E. hebridense Alexander, 1924
E. hirtistylatum Alexander, 1939
E. histrio Schiner, 1868
E. howense Alexander, 1922
E. illingworthi (Alexander, 1921)
E. imitans Alexander, 1913
E. immaculipes Alexander, 1941
E. inaequicinctum Alexander, 1941
E. inornatipes Alexander, 1939
E. insigne van der Wulp, 1878
E. insperatum Alexander, 1960
E. interspersum Alexander, 1953
E. juquicola Alexander, 1945
E. jurator Alexander, 1948
E. kempi Brunetti, 1913
E. kerberti de Meijere, 1919
E. klossi Brunetti, 1918
E. lipophleps Alexander, 1979
E. mediale Mao & Yang, 2009
E. melaxanthum Alexander, 1943
E. mephistophelicum Alexander, 1947
E. meridionalis Alexander, 1928
E. mithras Alexander, 1949
E. muscicola Alexander, 1943
E. nebulosum (Bellardi, 1859)
E. nephele Alexander, 1948
E. nigripleuralis Alexander, 1945
E. nigroplagiatum Alexander, 1939
E. nymphicum Alexander, 1928
E. ocellare (Linnaeus, 1760)
E. oreonympha Alexander, 1928
E. ornatipenne (Brunetti, 1918)
E. oxyphallus Alexander, 1939
E. parviseta Alexander, 1941
E. pendleburyi Edwards, 1928
E. perocellatum Alexander, 1966
E. persanctum Alexander, 1938
E. petalinum Alexander, 1947
E. petulantia Alexander, 1948
E. phaeoxanthum Alexander, 1944
E. punctatissimum (Wiedemann, 1828)
E. pupillatum Alexander, 1913
E. retrorsum Alexander, 1968
E. rhododendri Alexander, 1966
E. risorium Alexander, 1962
E. sackeni Williston, 1896
E. sappho Alexander, 1943
E. schmiederi Alexander, 1968
E. scoptes Alexander, 1965
E. septuosum Alexander, 1962
E. serristyla Alexander, 1945
E. signatum de Meijere, 1911
E. solatrix (Osten Sacken, 1860)
E. subenixum Alexander, 1939
E. subfascipenne Alexander, 1920
E. subinsigne Alexander, 1920
E. subobsoletum Alexander, 1936
E. subsolatrix Alexander, 1939
E. subvicinum Alexander, 1966
E. sultanum Alexander, 1938
E. sybariticum Alexander, 1947
E. terraereginae Alexander, 1922
E. trichomerum Alexander, 1955
E. varium (Wiedemann, 1828)
E. vicinum Brunetti, 1918
E. xanthomela Alexander, 1939
E. yunnanense Mao & Yang, 2009

Subgenus Eupolyphragma Alexander, 1948
E. angusticrenulum Alexander, 1931
E. apoense Alexander, 1931
E. bakeri Alexander, 1922
E. caninotum Alexander, 1931
E. cinereinotum Alexander, 1931
E. crenulatum Alexander, 1930
E. flavosternatum Alexander, 1930
E. fulvinotum Alexander, 1931
E. fuscinotum Alexander, 1931
E. fuscofasciatum Alexander, 1931
E. fuscosternatum Alexander, 1930
E. griseicapillum Alexander, 1931
E. hastatum Alexander, 1931
E. incisurale Alexander, 1932
E. joculator Alexander, 1960
E. latitergatum Alexander, 1931
E. minahassanum Alexander, 1935
E. multiplex Alexander, 1960
E. nigrotibiatum Alexander, 1931
E. ochrinotum Alexander, 1930
E. parvilobum Alexander, 1931
E. riveranum Alexander, 1932
E. staplesi Alexander, 1948
E. subcrenulatum Alexander, 1931
E. triarmatum Alexander, 1931
Subgenus Lipophragma Alexander, 1978
E. garrigoui (Alexander, 1948)
Subgenus Parepiphragma Alexander, 1960
E. (Parepiphragma) perideles Alexander, 1960
Uncertain placement:
E. infractum Alexander, 1948

References

Limoniidae
Nematocera genera